The 17th Huading Awards ceremony was held on August 9, 2015 at Shanghai.

Nominations and winners
Complete list of nominees and winners (denoted in bold)

References

2015 television awards
2015 in Chinese television
Huading Awards